Roberto Peretti (born 12 April 1966) is an Italian short track speed skater. He competed in the men's 5000 metre relay event at the 1992 Winter Olympics.

References

1966 births
Living people
Italian male short track speed skaters
Olympic short track speed skaters of Italy
Short track speed skaters at the 1992 Winter Olympics
Sportspeople from Turin